Kezar Falls is a small village on the Ossipee River in the town of Porter in Oxford County.

History 

An eighteenth-century settler in the area was George Kezar.  Kezar's hunting ability became the a subject of local folklore. One tradition says Kezar survived hand-to-hand combat with a bear, another that he sent a pack of wolves "scampering towards Canada" by hanging a bell around the neck of one of them.  Although neither George Kezar nor his progeny lived in what became the village of Kezar Falls, he established a rock-to-rock footbridge across the Ossipee River, resulting in the nearby falls being named Kezar Falls, as was the village settlement that grew up around the falls.  

Kezar Falls proved a good source of water power, which eventually was harnessed to drive woolen mills, and to generate electricity for the village. 

Kezar Falls was incorporated as "Porter Kezar Falls Village Corporation in the Town of Porter" by the Maine State Legislature.  A portion of Hiram, Maine also in Oxford County was added to the Porter Kezar Falls Village Corporation in 1913 as an amendment to Chapter 217 to increase the corporate limits of the Porter Kezar Falls Village Corporation.

Historically, there were two Kezar Falls Village Corporations: one at Porter and the other at Parsonsfield in York County, across the Ossipee River. However, the Parsonsfield Kezar Falls Village Corporation was formally repealed by the 107th Legislature of the State of Maine and accepted at Parsonsfield Town Meeting in 1975.

References

External links 

 

Villages in Maine
Villages in Oxford County, Maine
Villages in York County, Maine